Calamus may refer to:

Botany and zoology
 Calamus (fish), a genus of fish in the family Sparidae
 Calamus (palm), a genus of rattan palms
 Calamus, the hollow shaft of a feather, also known as the quill
 Acorus calamus, the sweet flag, a tall wetland plant, commonly referred to as calamus in herbal medicine

Place names
 Calamus, Iowa, United States
 Calamus, Wisconsin, United States
 Calamus Creek (disambiguation)
 Calamus Swamp, Ohio, United States

Other uses
 Calamus (DTP), a desktop publishing application
 Calamus (poems), a series of poems by American writer Walt Whitman
 Calamus Ensemble, a classical music ensemble featuring Roberto Carnevale
 Ensemble Cálamus, a classical music ensemble featuring Eduardo Paniagua
 USS Calamus (AOG-5) a Mettawee-class gasoline tanker acquired by the U.S. Navy
 Calamus or Kalamos, a figure in Greek mythology 
Calamus, a character from the 2014 puzzle/adventure game OneShot

See also 
 Calamis (disambiguation)